Louis Schweitzer is the name of:

Louis Schweitzer (businessman) (born 1942), chairman and former CEO of Renault
Louis Schweitzer (philanthropist) (1899–1971), paper industrialist and philanthropist, donated WBAI to Pacifica Radio